Sinclair Island Conservation Park is a protected area in the Australian state of South Australia associated with Sinclair Island which is located off the west coast of Eyre Peninsula about  south  of Penong.  The conservation park which was declared as Fauna Conservation Reserve in March 1967, was re-proclaimed in 1972 under the National Parks and Wildlife Act 1972 to ‘conserve island habitat and protect Australian sea lion haul-out areas.’

The conservation park is classified as an IUCN Category IA protected area.

References

External links
Sinclair Island Conservation Park webpage on protected planet

Conservation parks of South Australia
Protected areas established in 1967
1967 establishments in Australia
South Australian terrestrial protected areas with a marine zone